Mullingar Greyhound Stadium is a greyhound racing track located in south Mullingar in Ireland. The stadium has a grandstand restaurant, a fast food outlet and a number of bars. Racing takes place on a Saturday evening at 7.30pm and early Sunday afternoon.

History

Early history
Mullingar stands directly west of the R400 road and just north of the Newbrook Road. In the 1950s, the track underwent improvements including banking of the bends to compensate for a rather unusual shaped  circumference circuit. The first racing manager was Billy Bligh who served in that post until 1978 before handing over to Peter Kenny. Bligh had a greyhound called Splonk who won on the opening night at Shelbourne Park way back in 1927. A new stand and clubhouse was erected in 1972 and the provincial track boasted some of the best facilities outside Dublin. Prominent sire, Castledown Lad started racing here in the 1930s followed by Newdown Heather. Races over the years have included the Midland Puppy Stakes, Midland St Leger, Joe Clyne Memorial and Midland Cesarewitch.

Recent history
In recent times the Mullingar Greyhound Racing Company has invested in the facilities with an impressive 130 seated grandstand restaurant and the track received an original classic race in 2001 following the closure of the Boyne Valley Greyhound Stadium in Navan. The race the Cesarewitch was run over 600 yards at Navan from 1960-1998 before arriving at Mullingar over the same race distance.

Competitions
Cesarewitch

Track records
Current
  

Former

References

Greyhound racing venues in the Republic of Ireland
Sports venues in County Westmeath
Mullingar
1932 establishments in Ireland